The African Party of Independence of Cape Verde (PAICV) is a democratic socialist political party in Cape Verde. It was formerly a Marxist–Leninist communist party and the sole legal party in the country from 1981 to 1990. Its members are nicknamed "" (the tamarinds) in Portuguese, and they identify themselves with the color yellow.

History
In 1956, its forerunner, the African Party for the Independence of Guinea and Cape Verde (PAIGC), was founded by the Cape Verdean nationalist leader Amílcar Cabral (born in Guinea-Bissau). PAIGC fought to overthrow the Portuguese Empire, unify Cape Verde and Guinea-Bissau, and use its vanguardism to advance socialist revolution.

From 1961 on, the PAIGC fought a guerrilla warfare campaign in cooperation with its fraternal party umbrella group, the CONCP, during the Portuguese Colonial War. By 1973 the PAIGC controlled Guinea-Bissau, while Portugal's own Carnation Revolution in 1974 effectively dissolved the empire, relinquishing Cape Verde within the next year.

After the wars of national liberation, the PAIGC established a socialist state within both territories under Amilcar Cabral's brother, Luís Cabral.

Establishment
Following a military coup in Guinea-Bissau that ousted Cabral in November 1980, the Cape Verde portion of the party became the PAICV in January 1981; it was headed by the President of Cape Verde, Aristides Pereira. The PAICV was Cape Verde's sole legal party from 1981 until the abolition of the one-party state in 1990.

Multiparty democracy
At an extraordinary party congress in February 1990, the PAICV approved the introduction of multiparty democracy. Pereira stepped down as General Secretary of PAICV in July 1990, and Prime Minister Pedro Pires replaced him in August 1990. The PAICV won 23 of the 79 National Assembly seats in the January 1991 multiparty parliamentary election, losing to the Movement for Democracy (MpD). Pereira was subsequently defeated in the February 1991 presidential election, and PAICV again fared poorly in the December 1991 local elections. At a party congress in August 1993, Pires was replaced as General Secretary by Aristides Lima and was instead elected as President of PAICV.

The PAICV won 21 out of 72 National Assembly seats in the December 1995 parliamentary election. At a PAICV congress in September 1997, Pires faced José Maria Neves in a leadership contest, and Pires was elected with 68% of the vote. Pires stepped down as PAICV President in 2000 in preparation for a presidential bid in the next year's election and he was succeeded by Neves.

2001 election
In the presidential election held on 11 and 25 February 2001, PAICV candidate Pedro Pires, who won 46.52% of the vote in the first round, narrowly defeated the MpD's Carlos Veiga by a margin of only 12 votes in the run-off.

2006 election
In the parliamentary election held on 22 January 2006, PAICV won 52.28% of the popular vote and 41 out of 72 seats in the National Assembly.

In the presidential election held on 12 February 2006, Pedro Pires again narrowly defeated Carlos Veiga, winning 50.98% of the vote.

2011 election
In the parliamentary election held on 7 February 2011, the PAICV led by Jose Maria Neves won 52.68% of the popular vote and 38 out of 72 seats in the National Assembly.

In the presidential election held on 7 and 21 August 2011, Manuel Inocêncio Sousa lost to Jorge Carlos Fonseca (MpD) with 32.66% of the votes in the first round and 45.74% in the second round.

2016 election
PAICV lost 2016 presidential elections and president Jorge Carlos Fonseca was re-elected with very clear majority of the votes. PAICV even failed to forward a candidate. Before that PAICV had lost the 2016 parliamentary election. The main opposition party Movement for Democracy (MpD) won the parliamentary elections, taking back power after 15 years.

Ideology and affiliation
The PAICV describes itself as democratic socialist but began to trend towards social democracy in the 2010s. The party has been placed as left-wing on the political spectrum.

The party is a full member of the Socialist International.

Electoral history

Presidential elections

National Assembly elections

References

External links
 Official website 

 
1981 establishments in Cape Verde
Political parties established in 1981
Political parties in Cape Verde
Formerly ruling communist parties
Full member parties of the Socialist International